The men's light heavyweight event was part of the weightlifting programme at the 1936 Summer Olympics. The weight class was the second-heaviest contested, and allowed weightlifters of up to 82.5 kilograms. The competition was held on Monday, 3 August 1936.

Results

All figures in kilograms.

References

Sources
 Olympic Report	

Light Heavyweight